National Security is a 2003 American buddy cop action comedy film directed by Dennis Dugan, and starring Martin Lawrence and Steve Zahn. The supporting cast includes Bill Duke, Eric Roberts, Colm Feore, and Matt McCoy. It was shot at various locations in Greater Los Angeles, including Long Beach and Santa Clarita.

The film was released on January 17 2003, received negative reviews from critics, and grossed over $54 million worldwide at the box office.

Plot
Two LAPD policemen, Hank Rafferty and Charlie Reed, investigate a warehouse heist and discover a gang of thieves, one of whom kills Charlie before they escape.

Meanwhile, Earl Montgomery's lifelong dream to become a police officer is thwarted when he flunks police academy for accidentally causing an explosion. After Hank receives a warning from Detective Frank McDuff after interfering with the investigation of Charlie's death, he meets Earl when Hank notices him trying to get into his car after locking his keys inside. When Hank questions Earl, Earl race-baits and insults Hank to the point of getting himself arrested. A bumblebee comes along, to which Earl is allergic, causing him to panic. From afar, it appears as if Hank is brutalizing Earl when he is actually attempting to shoo the bee away by swatting it with his baton; a man catches the incident on videotape. Because of the incriminating evidence and a spiteful Earl lying about the accused brutalizing, Hank is terminated from the police force and charged with aggravated assault against Earl. He is sentenced to six months in prison.

After being released, Hank takes a job as a security guard and continues investigating Charlie's death. Noticing an alarm being tripped at a soda warehouse, Hank goes to investigate. Earl, who is working for the same security company, is on duty at the warehouse but is slacking off. Hank interrupts the heist, and a gunfight erupts with the thugs, during which Hank and Earl cross paths again. The two give chase to the thieves but are pulled over by the police for speeding.

One of the thieves drops a cell phone, which leads them to a semi-trailer truck. Inside the truck, Hank and Earl find the thieves' van. Earl tries to hotwire the van but accidentally triggers the alarm, alerting the thieves. After a brief shootout, Hank and Earl drive the van out of the truck and escape by driving off the edge of the Vincent Thomas Bridge. 

Inside the van are what look like ordinary beer kegs; Hank has them examined at a foundry, where they learn that the kegs are actually made of an atomic aerospace alloy, which is worth millions. Hank takes the van and the kegs to the house of his ex-girlfriend, Denise. They broke up after Hank was arrested, and Hank asks Earl to tell Denise the truth about the "assault". Earl promises, but when he sees that Denise is an attractive black woman, he breaks his promise and starts hitting on her, playing the victim again. This causes another fight between them, and Denise kicks both of them out. After a heated argument, Hank punches Earl in the face, before storming off. Later, the pair is cornered by police, learning that they are suspects in the earlier shootout. They escape and Hank realizes that the thieves must have an inside man in the police department.

That night, the pair trace the van's owner to an address and stake out the place, but Earl rushes inside on his own and is confronted by the thieves. Hank arrives just as Earl is shot in the leg, and before escaping, he recognizes one of the thieves, Nash, as Charlie's murderer. When Hank takes Earl to Denise to get his wound treated (which turns out to be simply a graze), a bee flies into the house and Earl runs for cover, making Denise realize that Hank's story about the "assault" on Earl was actually true. She slaps Earl for lying and reconciles with Hank.

Based on something overheard from Nash, they follow him to a meeting at a yacht club and witness him talking to McDuff, who is revealed to be Nash's inside man. Hank and Earl share everything they know with Hank's former boss, Lieutenant Washington, and then pretend to approach McDuff, offering to sell him back the "beer kegs" for $1 million. However, Nash learns about their plans and takes Washington hostage first. During the confrontation the next day, Earl and Hank meet with McDuff, Nash, and their men near the coast, rescuing Washington and accidentally starting a shootout, but the trio manage to kill or apprehend most of Nash's gang, including McDuff. Hank is shot, but he survives and kills Nash by dropping a nearby crane's lifting hook onto an unstable slab of rock that Nash is standing on, catapulting him into the ocean and finally avenging Charlie's death.

Six more months later, in honor of their heroic actions, Hank is reinstated in the LAPD and Earl is admitted to the force, and they are made partners. The two encounter a situation similar to where they met, in which a man is apparently locked out of his car. Earl helps the man but learns that he is actually a thief. He successfully stops the thief by shooting at the car, but the vehicle explodes soon after.

Cast
 Martin Lawrence as Earl Montgomery
 Steve Zahn as Hank Rafferty
 Colm Feore as Detective Frank McDuff
 Bill Duke as Lieutenant Washington
 Eric Roberts as Nash
 Timothy Busfield as Charlie Reed
 Robinne Lee as Denise
 Matt McCoy as District Attorney Robert Barton
 Brett Cullen as Heston
 Mari Morrow as Lola
 Stephen Tobolowsky as Billy Narthax
 Margaret Travolta as Judge
 Noel Gugliemi as Latino Convict
 Jonathan Loughran as Sarcastic Cop
 Leslie Jones as Britney, Trucker Woman
 Hal Fishman as himself
 Martin Klebba as Security Guard (uncredited)

Music
The main songs are:
 "Silly" - The Warden
 "One of These Days" - Wu-Tang Clan
 "95 South" - Cool Ade
 "All Good? - De La Soul
 "N.S.E.W." - Disturbing tha Peace
 Fruko y Sus Tesos ("El Preso") 
 Graveyard Soldjas ("Don't Start None") 
 Petey Pablo ("Blow Your Whistle") 
 Tracy ("One More Try") 
 Barry White ("Can't Get Enough Of Your Love Babe") 
 Fingaz ("Baby") 
 95 South ("Cool Ade (Extended Mix)") 
 Lil' O ("Ay Yo") 
 Bathgate ("Bump That") 
 Damian Valentine ("Revolution")

Reception
On Rotten Tomatoes the film has an approval rating of 11% based on 89 reviews, with an average rating of 3.5/10. The site's critics consensus reads: "The action in National Security is mindless, while the humor says nothing insightful about racial issues." On Metacritic the film has a weighted average score of 34 out of 100 based on 25 critics, indicating "generally unfavorable reviews". Audiences surveyed by CinemaScore gave the film an average grade of "B+" on scale of A+ to F.

Joe Leydon of Variety wrote that "Despite some tasty contributions from Lawrence and Zahn, too much of National Security has the bland flavor of microwaved leftovers." A. O. Scott of The New York Times said it "Lacks the wit to do anything new and instead recycles tired jokes and attitudes." Michael Wilmington of the Chicago Tribune wrote was critical of the script but said the actors save the film, and concludes "I wouldn't race out to see "National Security," but it does give you exactly what you'd expect: yocks, explosions and funny brawling buddies rolling all over those over-used L.A. freeways." Ann Hornaday of The Washington Post panned the film calling it "a by-the-numbers sop to adolescent testosterone overload" and said that to call Lawrence "a poor man's Richard Pryor" was both an insult to Pryor and to poor people.
Tom Long of The Detroit News wrote that the movie was "loud, crass, dumb and then even dumber." John Monaghan of the Detroit Free Press highlighted what he saw as an "off-putting" racial subtext that made him unable to enjoy the movie.

Kevin Thomas of the Los Angeles Times gave it a positive review and called it "A funny, raucous action comedy, effectively teams Martin Lawrence and Steve Zahn in a film that's both laugh out loud funny and surprisingly subtle."

References

External links
 
 

2003 films
2003 comedy films
2003 action comedy films
2000s buddy comedy films
2000s buddy cop films
American action comedy films
American buddy comedy films
American buddy cop films
American crime comedy films
Columbia Pictures films
2000s English-language films
Fictional portrayals of the Los Angeles Police Department
Films about security and surveillance
Films directed by Dennis Dugan
Films scored by Randy Edelman
Films set in Los Angeles
Films shot in Los Angeles
2000s American films